Nikola Mitrović (born 14 December 1997) is a Serbian professional footballer who plays as a right midfielder.

References

External links
Nikola Mitrović at fktuzlacity.com

1997 births
Living people
Serbian footballers
Serbian expatriate footballers
Expatriate footballers in Bosnia and Herzegovina
Serbian SuperLiga players
Premier League of Bosnia and Herzegovina players
FK Radnički Niš players
FK Ozren Sokobanja players
FK Car Konstantin players
FK Sinđelić Beograd players
FK Tuzla City players 
Association football midfielders